"White Gold" is the 23rd episode of Season 3 of the CBS-TV series M*A*S*H.

Overview
The Army's supplies of penicillin are low, and thefts are high. For its medicinal value in treating infections, and because it gets top dollar on the black market, the drug has earned the nickname "white gold".  A trio of soldiers dressed in spy gear is caught breaking into the 4077th's emergency ration. One is captured, who refuses to talk, and offers only a dog tag marked "Perkins" as identification. Radar O'Reilly traces the tag and learns it belonged to another soldier killed in action.

Lieutenant Colonel Flagg learns of the break-in and comes to the camp to investigate. Left alone to question the soldier, Flagg tells him "Get out!" and leaves the door open for him to escape. Injuring himself and trashing the tent, Flagg insists there was a struggle and promises to connect the incident to his latest case, studying penicillin turning up on the black market. (Flagg knows this to be happening—because he's been supplying the drug to informants.)

Recaptured, the soldier (whose name is disclosed as Johnson) explains to the M*A*S*Hers who he really is: an Army medic, who has been stealing small amounts of the drug to immediately treat soldiers on the front lines. Lieutenant Colonel Henry Blake (the hospital administrator) offers to share any surplus penicillin the camp has in the future—on the condition that Johnson and his buddies ask them for it.

External links

M*A*S*H (season 3) episodes
1975 American television episodes